Zuzana Černá (born 10 February 1983) is a Czech former professional tennis player.

Born in Prague, Černá won a total of twelve titles while competing on the ITF Circuit, eleven of which came in doubles.

In 2004, she left the tour and continued her career as a collegiate player for Baylor University in the United States.

ITF finals

Singles: 1 (1–0)

Doubles: 19 (11–8)

References

External links
 
 

1983 births
Living people
Czech female tennis players
Tennis players from Prague
Baylor Bears women's tennis players